Kathleen Blomquist was a United States Government official. In 2002, Blomquist was the Director of Media Relations for the White House Commission on Special Education.
According to her biography at the Commission, her previous work experience was as "director of advance" for the "Schundler for Governor" campaign, in New Jersey, "lead press advance representative for the 2000 Bush-Cheney presidential campaign, and worked for a "public affairs practice" in  New York, as a writer for the US Army's public affairs office in Germany and for the National Review.
The Department of Justice lists her as a "Senior Counsel", and as  an Associate Director of the DoJ's Office of Intergovernmental and Public Liaison, and a member of the Department's Task Force on Intellectual Property.

References

Living people
Year of birth missing (living people)